This article shows the 2006 season of South Korean football.

FIFA World Cup

National team results

Senior team

Under-23 team

K League

Regular season

Championship playoffs

Bracket

Final table

Korean FA Cup

Korean League Cup

Korean Super Cup

Korea National League

First stage

Second stage

Championship playoff

A3 Champions Cup

AFC Champions League

Group stage

Group E

Group F

Knockout stage

FIFA Club World Cup

Diary of the season
 March 12: The 2006 season of the K League kicks off.
 April 7: Goyang Kookmin Bank beats Incheon Korail 3-1 as the second division, the Korea National League gets underway.
 May 10: The first stage of the K League concludes with Seongnam Ilhwa Chunma as the winners.
 June 13: The second-half goals from Lee Chun-soo and Ahn Jung-hwan help Korea recover from 1–0 down, to beat Togo at the World Cup.
 June 18: A late goal from Park Ji-sung allows Korea to draw 1-1 with France at the World Cup.
 June 23: Korea's World Cup campaign comes to an end after a 2–0 loss to Switzerland.
 June 26: Pim Verbeek is announced as the new head coach of the South Korea national football team, replacing Dick Advocaat who left to take up a position with Zenit Saint Petersburg in Russia.
 July 8: Choi Jin-cheul retires from all football following a Hauzen Cup match against Incheon United. The first stage of the National League concludes with Goyang Kookmin Bank as the winners.
 July 26: The Korea Football Association retains Afshin Ghotbi and Hong Myung-bo as assistant coaches to new national team coach Verbeek. FC Seoul win the 2006 Hauzen Cup (Korean League Cup) with one match spare, after drawing 1-1 away to Suwon Samsung Bluewings.
 July 28: Changwon City beat Hyundai Mipo Dockyard 2–1 in the final of the National League Cup final.
 August 23: The second stage of the K League commences.

See also
Football in South Korea

References

External links

 
Seasons in South Korean football